The 1982 season was the first year that the Minnesota Twins played at the Metrodome, which they would continue to play in until 2009. The team finished 60–102, seventh in the AL West. It was the first time the Twins lost more than 100 games since moving to Minnesota.

Despite the Twins' new stadium, only 921,186 fans attended Twins games, the lowest total in the American League.

Offseason
 October 23, 1981: Mike Kinnunen was traded by the Twins to the St. Louis Cardinals for Jeff Little.
 January 12, 1982: Kirby Puckett was drafted by the Twins in the 1st round (3rd pick) of the 1982 Major League Baseball draft.

Regular season
The Hubert H. Humphrey Metrodome debuted with an April 3 exhibition game against the Philadelphia Phillies.  Philadelphia's Pete Rose had the first unofficial Metrodome hit, and Minnesota's Kent Hrbek homered twice.

In the regular-season home opener, outfielder Dave Engle had the Twins' first hit and home run in the Metrodome.  Third baseman Gary Gaetti homered twice and was thrown out at home trying to stretch a triple for an inside-the-park home run.  The Seattle Mariners beat the Twins 11-7.

On May 29, for the only time in Twins history, a catcher nabbed four base stealers in a single game: Sal Butera threw out Ken Griffey, Graig Nettles, Bobby Murcer and Willie Randolph of the New York Yankees. Otherwise, May was not a good month as the Twins went 3-26, the worst major league month in baseball since the Philadelphia Athletics posted a 2–28 record in June of 1916.  The Twins record slide of fourteen consecutive losses ended with a June 4 shutout win over Baltimore.

Only one Twins player made the All-Star Game in Montreal, first baseman Kent Hrbek.

On July 19, outfielder Tom Brunansky hit what will be the Twins only inside-the-park grand slam home run, ever.  Jerry Augustine of the Milwaukee Brewers threw the pitch.

Pitcher Terry Felton – who'd gone 0-3 in 1980 – finished this season 0-13, and would not pitch in the majors again.  His 0-16 career record is a major league record for futility.

Offense
Kent Hrbek hit .301 with 23 HR and 92 RBI.
Gary Ward hit .289 with 28 HR and 91 RBI.
Gary Gaetti hit 25 HR and 84 RBI.
Tom Brunansky hit 20 HR and 46 RBI.

Pitching

Reliever Ron Davis had 22 saves.

Defense

Season standings

Record vs. opponents

Notable transactions
 March 26, 1982: Tim Corcoran was released by the Minnesota Twins.
 April 10, 1982: Roy Smalley III was traded by the Twins to the New York Yankees for Ron Davis, Greg Gagne and Paul Boris.
 May 12, 1982: Doug Corbett and Rob Wilfong were traded by the Twins to the California Angels for Tom Brunansky, Mike Walters, and $400,000.
 May 12, 1982: Butch Wynegar and Roger Erickson were traded by the Twins to the New York Yankees for Larry Milbourne, Pete Filson, John Pacella and cash.
 July 21, 1982: Houston Jiménez was purchased by the Twins from the Broncos de Reynosa.

Roster

Player stats

Batting

Starters by position
Note: Pos = Position; G = Games played; AB = At bats; H = Hits; Avg. = Batting average; HR = Home runs; RBI = Runs batted in

Other batters

Pitching

Starting pitchers

Other pitchers

Relief pitchers

Farm system

Notes

References

External links
Player stats from www.baseball-reference.com
Team info from www.baseball-almanac.com

1982
1982 Major League Baseball season
1982 in sports in Minnesota